Tom Beynon (born c. 1941) was a Canadian football player who played for the Saskatchewan Roughriders and Ottawa Rough Riders. He won the Grey Cup with Saskatchewan in 1966 and with Ottawa in 1968 and 1969. He previously played football and studied at Queen's University. After his football career he became a lawyer in Waterloo, Ontario.

References

1940s births
Sportspeople from Waterloo, Ontario
Players of Canadian football from Ontario
Saskatchewan Roughriders players
Ottawa Rough Riders players
Living people